Las Dunas Airport  is a private airport of Jorge Chavez Dartnell - Escuela de Aviación Civil, subsidiary of Alas Peruanas University located in the city of Ica, Peru. It is used mainly for pilot training. The runway is on the northwest side of Ica.

See also

Transport in Peru
List of airports in Peru

References

External links
OpenStreetMap - Las Dunas
SkyVector Aeronautical Charts
Dirección General de Aeronáutica Civil: lista de aeródromos autorizados en el departamento de Ica

Airports in Peru
Buildings and structures in Ica Region